Ray King may refer to:

 Ray King (artist) (born 1950), artist known for his light responsive sculptures
 Ray King (baseball) (born 1974), Major League Baseball relief pitcher
 Ray King (entrepreneur) (born 1964), American entrepreneur
 Ray King (footballer) (1924–2014), English football goalkeeper
 Vibert Cornwall, who performed with the stage name of Ray King

See also
Raymond King (disambiguation)